Miss World Australia 2022 was the 19th edition of the Miss World Australia pageant. It was held on 29 April 2022. Kristen Wright of Victoria was crowned the Miss World Australia by outgoing titleholder Sarah Marschke of New South Wales. Wright will represent Australia at the Miss World 2022 pageant. This years pageant was held at the Palazzo Versace Australia in Main Beach, Queensland, Australia.

Results

Finalists
The 24 finalists were as follows:

References

External links
Official Website

2022 beauty pageants
2022 in Australia